Shavon O'Day Shields (born June 5, 1994) is an American-Danish professional basketball player for Olimpia Milano of the Italian Lega Basket Serie A (LBA) and the EuroLeague. He played college basketball for the Nebraska Cornhuskers men's basketball team.

High school career
As a junior, Shields was a second-team all-Class 6A honoree and a first-team All-Sunflower Conference selection, as he averaged 17 points and six rebounds a game. Shields transferred into Olathe Northwest for his sophomore year, earning Sunflower League Newcomer-of-the-Year accolades. He also starred playing AAU ball for the MoKan Elite and Coach Rodney Perry. An outstanding student with a 4.0 GPA, Shields was on the honor roll throughout high school and a National Honor Society member.

As a senior, Shields was a consensus first-team Class 6A selection in Kansas after averaging 21.2 points, 8.5 rebounds and 3.0 assists per game for Coach Michael Grove at Olathe Northwest High School. He helped the Ravens to a 20-2 record and an appearance in the sub-state finals. Shields helped Olathe Northwest to an unblemished record in league play, earning Sunflower Conference MVP honors. In addition, he earned second-team all-class honors from the Topeka Capital Journal and Wichita Eagle, a first-team all-metro selection by the Kansas City Star and was a finalist for the DiRenna Award, signifying the top player in the Kansas City area.

Shields came to Nebraska after being one of the top players in the Kansas City area throughout his prep career. Shields joined Willie Cauley-Stein as Olathe Northwest's first-ever Division I signees in November 2011. Shields totaled 1,068 points in his three-year career at the school and finished as the school's all-time leader in points, rebounds, free throws, field goals, steals and rebounds.

Recruitment
Shavon selected Nebraska over Texas Tech, Oregon State, Weber State, Long Beach State and Wyoming.

College career

Freshman year
Shields was twice named Big Ten Conference Freshman of the week during the 2012–13 NCAA Division I men's basketball season.

Sophomore year
Shields was the November 11, 2013 and March 10, 2014 men's basketball player of the week during the 2013–14 Big Ten Conference season. On January 31, 2014, he was named an Academic All-District by CoSIDA, placing him among the 40 finalists for fifteen 2013–14 Academic All-American basketball selections.

Junior year
On February 26, 2016, Shields became the first Nebraska men's basketball player to be named a First Team Academic All-American by the College Sports Information Directors of America (CoSIDA).

Senior year

Shields finished his career at Nebraska tied for fifth on the school's all-time scoring list (1,630 points). He led the Huskers in scoring his senior season with 16.8 points per game. The conference coaches named him 2nd Team, All-Big Ten, and the conference media panel selected him to its 3rd Team.

Academic Achievements

Shields also excelled as a student. During the 2015-2016 year, Shields was selected as the Male Student-Athlete of the Year, narrowly being selected over friend and fellow classmate Levi Gipson. Shields carried a 3.73 GPA in biological sciences and was a six-time member of Nebraska's scholar-athlete honor roll. Although participating in different sports, Shields and Gipson pushed each other in the classroom and both achieved First-team CoSIDA Academic All-American honors. Shields is the sixth Husker to be a CoSIDA Academic All-American in basketball, but the only one to be named to the first team.

College statistics
Correct as of 11 March 2016

|-
| style="text-align:left;"| 2012–13
| style="text-align:left;"| Nebraska
| 28 || 19 || 28.7 || .471 || .359 || .676 || 5.1 || 0.9 || 0.8 || 0.3 || 8.6
|-
| style="text-align:left;"| 2013–14
| style="text-align:left;"| Nebraska
| 32 || 32 || 32.6 || .443 || .316 || .721 || 5.8 || 1.6 || 0.9 || 0.3 || 12.8
|-
| style="text-align:left;"| 2014–15
| style="text-align:left;"| Nebraska
| 31 || 31 || 35.3 || .440 || .195 || .827 || 6.0 || 2.2 || 1.1 || 0.2 || 15.4
|-
| style="text-align:left;"| 2015–16
| style="text-align:left;"| Nebraska
| 30 || 30 || 30.7 || .470 || .364 || .769 || 5.1 || 2.7 || 1.3 || 0.3 || 16.8
|-
| style="text-align:center;" colspan="2"|Career
| 121 || 112 || 31.9 || .455 || .296 || .759 || 5.5 || 1.8 || 1.0 || 0.3 || 13.5
|-

Professional career

Fraport Skyliners (2016–2017)
On August 24, 2016, Shields signed with the German team Fraport Skyliners.

Dolomiti Energia Trento (2017–2018)
Fraport Skyliners Frankfurt loaned Shavon Shields to Aquila Basket Trento in the tail end of 2016-17.

Kirolbet Baskonia (2018–2020)
On July 18, 2018, Shields signed a two-year deal with Kirolbet Baskonia of the Liga ACB and the EuroLeague.
On June 30, 2020, Shields won the Liga ACB with Kirolbet Baskonia.

Olimpia Milano (2020–present)
On July 9, 2020, Shields signed with Olimpia Milano of the Lega Basket Serie A and the EuroLeague. He averaged 13.8 points and 4.0 rebounds per game, shooting 43.2 percent from three-point range. Shields was named to the All-EuroLeague second team. He extended his contract for two seasons on September 8, 2021. On December 6, he suffered a fracture of the right radius with capsuloligamentous involvement during the fourth quarter of a game against Real Madrid. He was most recently The LBA Most Valuable Player Finals (2022)

Career statistics

EuroLeague

|-
| style="text-align:left;"| 2018–19
| style="text-align:left;"| Baskonia
| 33 || 30 || 24.2 || .502 || .356 || .883 || 2.8 || 1.1 || .6 || .1 || 9.8 || 9.2
|- class="sortbottom"
| style="text-align:left;"| Career
| style="text-align:left;"|
| 33 || 30 || 24.2 || .502 || .356 || .883 || 2.8 || 1.1 || .6 || .1 || 9.8 || 9.2

 2× All-EuroLeague Second Team (2021, 2022) Italian League champion (2022) Italian Cup winner (2021) Italian Super Cup winner (2020)

Personal
Shields is the son of National Football League (NFL) Hall of Famer Will Shields. His mother, Senia, is Danish. He was a high school teammate of Willie Cauley-Stein at Olathe Northwest High School.  Shields represented the Denmark national basketball team in U20 competitions and joined the national team again in 2018 for the EuroBasket 2022 Pre-Qualifiers. In 2020 he wed his long-time girlfriend Taylor Shields

References

External links
EuroLeague profile
ESPN profile
Nebraska Cornhuskers bio

1994 births
Living people
American expatriate basketball people in Germany
American expatriate basketball people in Italy
American expatriate basketball people in Spain
American men's basketball players
American people of Danish descent
Aquila Basket Trento players
Basketball players from Kansas
Danish expatriate basketball people in Italy
Danish men's basketball players
Lega Basket Serie A players
Liga ACB players
Nebraska Cornhuskers men's basketball players
Olimpia Milano players
Sportspeople from Olathe, Kansas
Saski Baskonia players
Shooting guards
Skyliners Frankfurt players
Small forwards